Sir William George Dismore Upjohn, OBE (16 March 1888 – 18 January 1979) was a noted Australian surgeon. From Narrabri in New South Wales, he received his medical education at the University of Melbourne and served at Royal Melbourne Hospital before entering private practice. A lieutenant-colonel within the Australian Army Medical Corps during World War I, he served in the Gallipoli campaign, investigating a dysentery epidemic, before being transferred to France in 1916. He was twice mentioned in dispatches.

After his discharge he joined the Royal College of Surgeons and resumed duties as a surgeon and general practitioner in Melbourne. He helped found the Royal Australasian College of Surgeons, and was a member of medical committees during World War II working to coordinate medical matters for the armed forces. He was also Chancellor of the University of Melbourne between 1966 and 1967.

References

1888 births
1979 deaths
Australian surgeons
People educated at Wesley College (Victoria)
Melbourne Medical School alumni
Chancellors of the University of Melbourne
People from the North West Slopes
Australian Knights Bachelor
Australian Officers of the Order of the British Empire
Australian people of World War I
20th-century surgeons